Thomas Bush (22 February 1914 – 1969) was an English footballer who played in the Football League for Liverpool.

External links
 

English footballers
English Football League players
Liverpool F.C. players
1914 births
1969 deaths
Association football defenders